Satan's Horns is an EP by Taiwanese extreme metal band ChthoniC. It served as the promotional song and video to the Taiwanese release of the film Freddy vs. Jason.

Track listing

Credits
Freddy Lim – vocals
Jesse Liu – guitar
A-Jay - drums
Doris Yeh – bass guitar
Luis - piano/synthesizer

References

2003 EPs
Chthonic (band) albums